Deokund  is a small town in the Goh block of Aurangabad District of Bihar state in India. It belongs to the Magadh division. It is 80 km from Patna and 973 km from the national capital of Delhi. Large numbers of people go there for Chhath Puja every year.

References

Villages in Aurangabad district, Bihar